Highway M20 is the second shortest Ukraine international highway (M-highway) which connects Kharkiv to the border with Russia at Hoptivka in Kharkiv Raion in Kharkiv Oblast (Kharkivshchyna) (Ukrainian: Дергачівський район, Ха́рківська о́бласть (Харківщина)) and Nehoteevka in Belgorodsky Raion in Belgorodskaya Oblast (Russian: Нехотеевка, Белгородский район, Белгоро́дская о́бласть). The section from Lisne to the Russian border is part of European route E105, known as the Crimea Highway (Крым шоссе) in Russia.

In 2011, major renovations took place on segments of the road in preparation to the Euro 2012.

Route

See also

 Roads in Ukraine
 Ukraine Highways
 International E-road network
 Pan-European corridors

References

External links
International Roads in Ukraine in Russian
European Roads in Russian

Roads in Kharkiv Oblast